Bagamoyo is one of the six districts of the Pwani Region of Tanzania.  It is bordered to the north by the Tanga Region, to the west by the Morogoro Region, to the east by the Indian Ocean and to the south by the Kibaha District. The district capital is at Bagamoyo.

In 2016 the Tanzania National Bureau of Statistics report there were 106,484 people in the district, from 311,740 in 2012, of which 97,660 where in current district wards. The decrease being from splitting of the district and creation of the Chalinze District in 2015.

Wards

There are 25 wards in the Bagamoyo District:
 Bago
 Chalinze
 Chasimba
 Dunda
 Kibindu
 Kiromo
 Kiwangwa
 Kongo
 Lugoba
 Magomeni
 Masuguru
 Matimbwa
 Msata
 Msinune
 Mwavi 
 Yombo
 Zinga
 Mkange
 Saadani
 Matipwili
 Miono
 Mandamazingara
 Mandera
 Kimange
 Mbwewe

References

Sources
The 2012 Population and Housing Census (PHC) for United Republic of Tanzania

 
Districts of Pwani Region